The Taraknath temple, dedicated to the Hindu god Shiva worshiped as Taraknath, is a major pilgrimage spot in the town of Tarakeswar, West Bengal, India. Built in 1729, the temple is an atchala structure of Bengal temple architecture with a 'natmandir' in front. Close by are the shrines of Kali and Lakshmi Narayan. Dudhpukur, a tank to the north of the Shiva temple is believed to fulfil the prayers of those taking a dip in it.

Baba Taraknath also known as Baba Tarakeshwar or Baba Tarakeshwarnath. He is a violent (Ugra) form of Lord Shiva who drank venom (Vish) during Samudra-manthan.
Tarakeshwarnath is the husband of Bhagwati Tara. His shivalinga is also situated in Bengal, a few kilometres away from Tarapith. He grants his devotees a good health and life from which anything can be achieved.
It is said that those who are true devotees of Tara and Tarak , Bhagwati Tara breastfeeds that devotee and then the devotee attains moksha or salvation.

Legends
As per local legends, the temple was built by Raja Bharamalla Rao to discover a Linga in the jungles near Tarakeswar. The temple was later built around the swayambhu linga (self-manifested) referred as Baba Taraknath in 1729 AD.

Festivities
Pilgrims visit the temple throughout the year, especially on Mondays. But thousands of pilgrims visit Tarakeswar on the occasions of 'Shivaratri' and 'Gajan', the former taking place in Phalgun (Feb-March) while the latter lasts for five days ending on the last day of Chaitra (mid-April).  The month of Sravana (mid-July to mid-August) is auspicious for Shiva when celebrations are held n each Monday.

References

External links

 Taraknath Temple wikimapia

Hindu temples in Hooghly district
18th-century Hindu temples
Hindu temples in West Bengal
Buildings and structures in Hooghly district
Shiva temples in West Bengal
Tourist attractions in Hooghly district